Kate Constable (born 1966) is an Australian author. Her first novel was The Singer of All Songs, the first in the Chanters of Tremaris trilogy. It was later followed by The Waterless Sea and The Tenth Power.

Biography
Constable was born in Sandringham, Melbourne. When she was six, her family moved to Papua New Guinea for her father's work as a pilot.

She enrolled in an Arts/Law degree at Melbourne University. She finished her degrees in seven years, working part-time in various jobs. She settled into the job that was to become her main source of income for the next thirteen years: phone sales, administration assistant and occasional receptionist at Warner Music.

She started writing after many years at law school and at Warner. In 1993 her first short story, "Graham Remains", was published in the literary magazine Meanjin. In 1996 she won second prize in the annual HQ short story competition.

After her first attempt at a novel, she met and fell in love with the man who is now her husband. She started to write fantasy books, the first of which became known as The Singer of All Songs. In 2001, she and her husband had a baby daughter, and The Singer of All Songs was accepted for publication only a few weeks later.

Bibliography

Novels
Chanters of Tremaris
The Singer of All Songs (2002)
The Waterless Sea (2005)
The Tenth Power (2006)
Chanters of Tremaris Trilogy (2009, omnibus of the three novels)

Other novels
The Taste of Lightning (2007)
Always Mackenzie (2008, book 4 in the Girlfriend Fiction series)
Cicada Summer (2009)
Winter of Grace (2009, book 10 in the Girlfriend Fiction series)
Dear Swoosie (2010, with Penni Russon, book 17 in the Girlfriend Fiction series)
Crow Country (2011)
New Guinea Moon (2013)
The January Stars (2020)
Tumbleglass (2023)

Short fiction
"Graham Remains" (1993) in Meanjin

Awards and honors
Aurealis Awards
Best young-adult novel
2007 Nomination for The Taste of Lightning
2009 Short-listed (Best Children's Long Fiction) for Cicada Summer
The Children's Book Council of Australia Book of the Year Awards
2003 Notable Book (Older Readers) for Singer of All Songs
2004 Notable Book (Older Readers) for The Waterless Sea
2008 Notable Book (Older Readers) for The Taste of Lightning
2010 Notable Book (Older Readers) for Winter of Grace
2012 Winner: Children's Book of the Year Award: Younger Readers for Crow Country
Other Awards
2009 joint winner Children's Peace Literature Award for Winter for Grace
2021 short-listed Prime Minister's Literary Award for January Stars

References

External links
 Official website

1966 births
Living people
Australian fantasy writers
Australian women novelists
Writers from Melbourne
20th-century Australian novelists
Women science fiction and fantasy writers
20th-century Australian women writers
People from Sandringham, Victoria
University of Melbourne alumni